Cold Blood is a television series first broadcast on 19 October 2005, on ITV1. Three series of the show were broadcast. The series stars Matthew Kelly as Brian Wicklow, a notorious serial killer who assists the police with investigations into murders and serial offenders. The series also features John Hannah as Jake Osborne and Jemma Redgrave as Detective Sergeant Eve Granger.

Three official series of the show were produced: two stand-alone feature-length episodes and one final series comprising three individual stories. The show ceased production in 2007 following declining viewing figures; and the final episode was broadcast on 3 January 2008, to a mere 3.98m, a drop of more than 3 million viewers since the first episode.

Cast
 Matthew Kelly as Brian Wicklow
 Jemma Redgrave as DS Eve Granger
 Claudia Perrins as Young Eve Granger
 John Hannah as Jake Osbourne
 Ace Bhatti as DC Ajay Roychowdry
 David Calder as Professor Robert Kerr (Series 1—2)
 Pauline Quirke as DCI Hazel Norton (Series 2—3)
 Paul Gabriel as PC Neil Doyle

Episodes

Series 1 (2005)

Series 2 (2007)

Series 3 (2007-2008)

References

External links

2005 British television series debuts
2008 British television series endings
2000s British drama television series
2000s British crime television series
ITV television dramas
Television series by ITV Studios
Television shows produced by Granada Television
English-language television shows